Grace Stewart may refer to:

 Grace Stewart (field hockey) (born 1997), Australian field hockey player
 Grace Anne Stewart (1893–1970), first woman to graduate in geology in Canada
 Grace Campbell Stewart (died 1863), British miniature painter